Félix Lebuhotel (21 July 1932 – 5 November 2008) was a French professional racing cyclist. He rode in three editions of the Tour de France.

References

External links
 

1932 births
2008 deaths
French male cyclists
Sportspeople from Manche
Cyclists from Normandy